Hampton Methodist Church is a Methodist church on Percy Road, Hampton in the London Borough of Richmond upon Thames, in England. Since 2019, Hampton Methodist Church has been part of Hampton Mission Partnership. Hampton Mission Partnership was formed in July 2019 by Hampton Methodist Church and Hampton Baptist Church, after Hampton Baptist Church permanently closed.

History
The first chapel, a Wesleyan chapel on Church Street in Hampton, was built in 1861. It was replaced in 1926 by a new chapel on Percy Road. The current church was opened in 1963. It is located on the west side of Percy Road between Priory Road and Lindon Road (Percy Road, Hampton TW12 2JT).

Ministers/pastors since 1888
?–1888  Rev William Edward Sellers	
1888–1890	Rev S Burrow	
1890–1894	Rev James Walter	
1894–1897	Rev William Rapson	
1897–1900	Rev William Henry Groves	
1900–1904	Rev John Palmer	
1904–1906	Rev C O Eldridge	
1909–1910	Rev William T Gill	
1910–1913	Rev Francis W Moon	
1913–1914	Rev C R Burroughs	
1914–1916	Rev Armand J T Le Gros	
1916–1920	Rev George R Forde	
1920–1926	Rev W Jackson Bush	
1926–1928	Rev M Ferdinand Crewdson	
1928–1931	Rev F E Lines	
1931–1936	Rev F J Bushby Quine	
1936–1942	Rev Harry Holroyd	
1942–1946	Rev Geoffrey W Collinson	
1946–1950	Rev Francis V Burns	
1950–1954	Rev Victor Taylor	
1954–1958	Rev Martin H Yeomans	
1958–1962	Rev Ronald D Redman	
1962–1968	Rev Donald S Hailey	
1968–1973	Rev Peter H Mundy	
1973–1982	Rev Harry A Dodd	
1982–1987	Rev J Arnold Clay	
1987–1996	Rev Ronald F Kemp	
1996–2002	Mr Jim Stockley	
2002–2005	Mrs Janet Brown	
2005–2008	Rev David Woodward	
2008–2013	Mr Ben Haslam	
2013–2020 	Rev Vicci Davidson
2020–Present 	Rev Kan Yu

References

External links
 Official website

Methodist churches in the London Borough of Richmond upon Thames
1861 establishments in England